Babar Ali may refer to:

People 

 Babar Ali, film and television actor  
 Babar Ali, cricketer from Pakistan 
 Babar Ali, teacher from India 
 Babar Ali Khan, Nawab of Bengal, Bihar, and Orissa 
 Babar Ali Khan, boxer from Pakistan 
 Babar Ali Khan Mohmand, politician from Pakistan
Syed Babar Ali, former finance minister of Pakistan